Earle is an English given name, and may refer to:

 Earle Bergey (1901–1952), American illustrator
 Earle Birney (1904–1995), Canadian poet; recipient of the Governor General's Award for Literature
 Earle Brown (1926–2002), American composer
 Earle Bruce (1931-2018), former American college football coach
 Earle Childs (1893–1918), American soldier who died during World War I
 Earle Combs (1899–1976), American Major League Baseball player
 Earle Hagen (1919-2008), American composer
 Earle Hyman (1926-2017), American actor
 Earle Labor (1928-2022), American historian; biographer of Jack London
 Earle Bradford Mayfield (1881–1964), American politician; United States Senator
 Earle "Greasy" Neale (1891-1973), American football & baseball player & coach
 Earle Nelson (1897-1928), American serial killer, rapist, and necrophile
 Earle Ovington (1879–1936), American aeronautical engineer, aviator and inventor; "Official Air Mail Pilot #1"
 Earle Page (1880–1961), Eleventh Prime Minister of Australia
 Earle S. Warner (1880–1971), New York politician and judge

See also
 Earl (given name)
 Earlene (given name)
 Errol (disambiguation)